John Tillman Lamkin (also spelled John Tilman Lamkin) (July 17, 1811 – May 19, 1870) was a Southern United States politician who served in the Confederate States Congress during the American Civil War. 

Lamkin was born in Augusta, Georgia, the son of William and Keziah Hart Snead Lamkin.  He married Thurza Ann Kilgore in Georgia on November 14, 1835.  He was admitted to the Georgia Bar in 1833.  He lived in Louisiana and Texas before settling in Mississippi, and was admitted to the Mississippi bar in 1838.

In November 1863 he was elected to serve in the House of Representatives of the Second Confederate Congress, and from May 2, 1864 to March 18, 1865 he served on three committees: commerce, patents, post offices and post roads.

Lamkin died in Pike County, Mississippi at the age of 58, and is buried in Woodlawn Cemetery in Summit, Mississippi.

He related to the descendant family of Wilkins.

References

External links
John Tillman Lamkin at Find a Grave (the tombstone is engraved "John T. Lamkin")

1811 births
1870 deaths
Members of the Confederate House of Representatives from Mississippi
19th-century American politicians
Mississippi lawyers
Mississippi Democrats
Politicians from Augusta, Georgia
19th-century American lawyers